Gary Christofer Kagelmacher Pérez (born 21 April 1988) is a Uruguayan professional footballer who plays as a right-back or a central defender for Chilean club Universidad Católica.

Club career
Born in Montevideo of German descent, Kagelmacher began his professional career with local club Danubio FC. In 2007, aged 19, he was loaned to Real Madrid Castilla in the Spanish Segunda División B, being first choice from an early stage; the move was made permanent at the end of his first season.

In the last match of the 2008–09 campaign, Kagelmacher made his La Liga debut with Real Madrid, starting in a 2–1 away loss against CA Osasuna. In the summer of 2010, he was loaned to K.F.C. Germinal Beerschot of the Belgian Pro League.

Kagelmacher agreed to a permanent four-year contract at Beerschot on 6 May 2011. In the following transfer window, however, he moved countries again and signed with AS Monaco FC of the French Ligue 2.

On 30 June 2014, Kagelmacher joined TSV 1860 Munich on a three-year deal, arriving from Valenciennes FC. He scored his first goals for his new team on 8 March of the following year, but in a 3–2 home defeat to SV Sandhausen.

After one season in the Israeli Premier League with Maccabi Haifa F.C. and two and a half in the Belgian top division at the service of K.V. Kortrijk, the 31-year-old Kagelmacher returned to his homeland in the 2020 January transfer window after signing with Peñarol. He competed abroad subsequently, with Club León in the Mexican Liga MX and Club Deportivo Universidad Católica in the Chilean Primera División.

International career
Kagelmacher played for the Uruguay under-17 side at the 2005 FIFA World Championship. Two years later, he appeared with the under-20s at the 2007 World Cup.

Career statistics

References

External links

1988 births
Living people
Uruguayan people of German descent
Uruguayan footballers
Footballers from Montevideo
Association football defenders
Uruguayan Primera División players
Danubio F.C. players
Peñarol players
La Liga players
Segunda División B players
Real Madrid Castilla footballers
Real Madrid CF players
Belgian Pro League players
Beerschot A.C. players
K.V. Kortrijk players
Ligue 1 players
Championnat National 2 players
Ligue 2 players
AS Monaco FC players
Valenciennes FC players
2. Bundesliga players
TSV 1860 Munich players
Israeli Premier League players
Maccabi Haifa F.C. players
Liga MX players
Club León footballers
Chilean Primera División players
Club Deportivo Universidad Católica footballers
Uruguay youth international footballers
Uruguay under-20 international footballers
Uruguayan expatriate footballers
Expatriate footballers in Spain
Expatriate footballers in Belgium
Expatriate footballers in Monaco
Expatriate footballers in France
Expatriate footballers in Germany
Expatriate footballers in Israel
Expatriate footballers in Mexico
Expatriate footballers in Chile
Uruguayan expatriate sportspeople in Spain
Uruguayan expatriate sportspeople in Belgium
Uruguayan expatriate sportspeople in Monaco
Uruguayan expatriate sportspeople in France
Uruguayan expatriate sportspeople in Germany
Uruguayan expatriate sportspeople in Israel
Uruguayan expatriate sportspeople in Mexico
Uruguayan expatriate sportspeople in Chile